The 2017 Cork Intermediate Hurling Championship was the 108th staging of the Cork Intermediate Hurling Championship since its establishment by the Cork County Board in 1909. The draw for the opening rounds took place on 11 December 2016. The championship began on 28 April 2017 and ended on 28 October 2017.

On 28 October 2017, Aghada won the championship following a 0-16 to 0-9 defeat of Éire Óg in the final. This was their first championship title in the grade.

Éire Óg's Kevin Hallissey was the championship's top scorer with 1-59.

Team changes

To Championship

Promoted from the Cork Junior Hurling Championship
 Mayfield
 Sarsfields

From Championship

Promoted to the Cork Premier Intermediate Hurling Championship
 Fr. O'Neill's

Results

Preliminary round

Round 1

Round 2A

Round 2B

Relegation playoffs

Round 3

Round 4

Quarter-finals

Semi-finals

Final

Championship statistics

Top scorers

Overall

In a single game

References

External link

 2017 Cork IHC results

Cork Intermediate Hurling Championship
Cork Intermediate Hurling Championship